Logan Bonner (born September 24, 1997) is an American football quarterback for the Utah State Aggies.

High school career
Bonner grew up in Rowlett, Texas, and attended Rowlett High School.

College career

Arkansas State
He began his college football career at Arkansas State. After red-shirting in 2016, he played for the Arkansas State football team from 2017 to 2020. He received a bachelor's degree in sports management from Arkansas State.

Utah State
In 2021, Bonner followed Arkansas State coach Blake Anderson to Utah State, enrolling there as a graduate student. During the 2021 season, he completed 263 of 429 passes for 3,628 yards and 36 touchdowns. His 2021 totals of 3,628 passing yards and 36 touchdowns set new Utah State records.

Bonner returned to Utah State for his sixth season of college football in 2022.  In July 2022, he was named to the Maxwell Award watch list. His 2022 season ended at the end of September due to a foot injury sustained against UNLV. He ended the season with 753 passing yards with six touchdowns, eight interceptions, and a 56.8% completion rate.

References

External links
 Utah State bio

Living people
American football quarterbacks
Arkansas State Red Wolves football players
Utah State Aggies football players
Players of American football from Texas
1997 births